The Parish of Manchester is a parish located in west-central Jamaica, in the county of Middlesex. Its capital, Mandeville, is a major business centre. Its St. Paul of the Cross Pro-Cathedral is the episcopal see of the Latin Catholic Diocese of Mandeville.

History
Taino/Arawak settlement in the parish was substantiated when in 1792, a surveyor found three carvings, believed to be Amerindian Zemi, in a cave in the Carpenter's Mountains. They are now at the British Museum.

Manchester was formed in 1814, by an Act of the House of Assembly, making it one of the newest parishes of Jamaica. It was formed as a result of the amalgamation of portions of the parishes St. Elizabeth, Clarendon and the entirety of Vere. The amalgamation was done in response to a petition from the inhabitants of Mile Gully, May Pen and Carpenters Mountain who complained that they were too far away from an administrative centre. Manchester was named in honour of William Montagu, 5th Duke of Manchester, the then Governor of Jamaica. He was governor for 19 years, setting the record as the longest-serving governor of the island. The capital town, Mandeville, established in 1816, was named after his eldest son, Lord Mandeville.

No sugar estates can be found in the parish; slaves worked on coffee plantations.  After emancipation, the ex-slaves became independent coffee farmers. The irish potato was first introduced to Jamaica at Bethany, a town in the parish. Citrus also became an important crop, as in 1920, the citrus fruit ortanique, a cross between the orange and tangerine, was developed by Charles Jackson.

Many of Jamaica's businesses were started in Mandeville; the Mandeville Hotel, one of the oldest in the Caribbean, began operations in 1875. The first "Free Library" in Jamaica was established in 1938, and is the oldest Parish Library.

The growth of the town was given a substantial stimulus when Alcan Bauxite Company opened operations there. It built houses for its then mostly expatriate staff. The relatively high wages lured many educated Jamaicans there. Mandeville continues to grow rapidly due to it being considered one of the most attractive towns in Jamaica and the cleanest of them all.

Mandeville boasts no fewer than 14 shopping centres, two hospitals (one public and one private), medical centres and many doctors. Next to Kingston, it provides the best medical services in the island, a major asset for tourism development.

Population
The population of Manchester is 190,812. Mandeville, the capital and chief town of the parish, has a Mayor, Donovan Mitchell  and a deputy mayor, Rohan Kennedy  It has a population of over 30,485.

Geography
Mandeville, the parish capital is located at latitude 17°51'N, longitude 77°38'W. Manchester is bordered by St. Elizabeth in the west, Clarendon in the east and by Trelawny in the north. Manchester covers an area of 830 km2, making it Jamaica's sixth-largest parish. It has three mountain ranges — the Carpenters Mountains, the May Day Mountains, and the Don Figuerero Mountains. Manchester is divided into four political districts (constituencies): North-West, North-East, Central and Southern Manchester.

Over 90% of the parish's surface is limestone so there is an abundance of cockpits, sinkholes, caves and underground passages. Gourie Cave, near Christiana, is the longest of the over 100 caves in the parish, as well as the longest known cave in Jamaica (3505m). Smokey Hole Cave, in Cross Keys, is the deepest known cave on the island (194m). Oxford Cave, near Auchtembeddie, in the NW part of the parish, is another of the major speleological sites found in Manchester, and was once noted as a roosting site for the now possibly extinct bat species Phyllonycteris aphylla. Manchester also has large bauxite deposits, with parts of the parish having been strip-mined as a result, notably in William's Field, Hope, and Blue Mountain.

The parish offers a variety of climate, vegetation and scenery. There are very few rivers in the parish, and the existing ones are rather small; Alligator Hole River, Alligator Pond River, Gut River, Hector's River, Two Rivers, and Swift River. Hector's River runs along the border of Manchester and Trelawny, sinks at Troy where it flows underground for approximately six kilometers and rises below Oxford Cave as One Eye River. Despite this, water supply is generally scarce; the southern districts often suffer drought.

Commerce
There is no large-scale cultivation of crops as the area is generally mountainous. Crops such as sugar cane require large tracts of flat land. Bananas, coffee and pimento, annatto, ginger are grown, and the parish is noted for its citrus; oranges, ortaniques and grapefruit, much of which are exported. The Christiana Land Authority assists agricultural development in the region. Irish potato is grown considerably in the Christiana area and it is the centre of a large banana and ginger-growing district.

Manchester is a centre of the bauxite mining industry. The first bauxite mining companies were Alcan and Alpart. Alcan, a large world-renowned Canadian company, had a strong presence in the town and was one of the main employers. It lured many Jamaicans because of high salaries and the benefits offered. Alpart, short for Aluminum Partners of Jamaica, was initially formed as a joint venture of Kaiser Aluminum, Reynolds Aluminum, and Anaconda. It is still in operation in Nain St Elizabeth parish, however it is now jointly owned by UC Rusal of Russia and Hydro Aluminum of Norway.

The parish created the Manchester Local Sustainable Development Plan in 2007 to improve the community over the next 20 years.

Television
 ZQI-TV (TVJ) Channel 13, Spur Tree, Jamaica, Hype TV, CVM, NCU Television (Ch. 188- Flow)

Special attractions
Captain Alexander Woodburn Heron's tomb at the top of Shooter's Hill, now called "Heron Hill" by the locals.

Roxborough Estate is the birthplace of Jamaican National Hero and its first premier, Norman Washington Manley.

Education

High schools
Secondary high

 Belair High
 Bellefield High
 Bishop Gibson High (girls)
 Christiana High
 Cross Keys High
 DeCarteret College
 Manchester High
 May Day High
 Mile Gully High
 Mount St Joseph High School
 New Forest High
 Porus High  
 Winston Jones High

Technical high

 Holmwood Technical High

Private high
 Sacred Heart 
 St Michael's Institute
 Beaumont High
 Bethel Christian
 Victor Dixon High

Universities
There are several notable tertiary institutions, the Northern Caribbean University (NCU), a Seventh-day Adventist institution, formerly called West Indies College, the Church Teacher's College, Mandeville, The Catholic College, Knox Community College, Cobbla and Mandeville Campuses. There are also other religious-based institutions located in the parish: Regent College of the Caribbean (the former Jamaica Bible College) as well as Bethel Bible College.

Notable people
 Donovan Bailey, retired Olympic sprinter
 Annastasia Baker, UK based Gospel, R&B, soul singer and songwriter
 Kemoy Campbell distance runner, athlete
 Nesta Carter, athlete
 Alexander Worthy Clerk, Moravian missionary to the Gold Coast, now Ghana
 Ce'cile, musician
 Charmaine Crooks, Olympic athlete
 Paul R. Cunningham, Jamaican American surgeon
 General Degree, DJ
 Heavy D (born Dwight Arrington Myers), rapper
 Derrick Evans, "Mr. Motivator", fitness instructor
 Ijahman Levi, reggae musician
 Luciano, reggae musician
 Norman Washington Manley (1893 - 1969), Jamaica's first Premier and one of Jamaica's National Heroes.
 Winston McAnuff, reggae musician
 Lovel Palmer, Jamaican and international footballer
 Sheryl Lee Ralph, actress and singer
 Tony Rebel, reggae musician
 Garnett Silk, reggae musician
 Sherone Simpson, athlete
 Elaine Thompson, athlete
 Christopher Williams, athlete

References

 Manchester Parish Library
 Statistical Institute of Jamaica
 Political Geography of Jamaica

External links

 Statin Jamaica

 
Parishes of Jamaica
1814 establishments in the British Empire